Neophrontops is an extinct genus of Old World vulture. Despite being taxonomically an "Old World" vulture, specifically a member of the subfamily Gypaetinae, it was native to North America, with six species having been named, spanning from the Early Miocene to the Late Pleistocene, all except N. americanus only known from fragmentary remains, though well preserved remains are known from the late Middle-Late Pleistocene aged La Brea Tar Pits of Southern California.

Taxonomy 

 N. americanus (Early Miocene to Late Pleistocene) Questioned whether all remains assigned to this species belonged to it because "if it had corresponded to one biological species, it would have had an extraordinary vast existence."
 N. dakotensis (Early-Middle Pliocene) Only known from a distal humerus
 N. vetustus (Middle Miocene)  Only known from a distal humerus, which only differs from that of N. dakotensis by the fact that it is about half the size
 N. slaughteri (Late Pliocene)
 N. vallecitoensis (Middle Pleistocene)

References

Accipitridae
Pleistocene birds of North America